Royal Air Force Sibson or more simply RAF Sibson is a former Royal Air Force satellite station located in Sibson, Cambridgeshire, England, west of Peterborough. 

The following units were here at some point:
 No. 2 Central Flying School RAF
 No. 7 (Pilots) Advanced Flying Unit RAF
 No. 7 Service Flying Training School RAF
 No. 13 Elementary Flying Training School RAF
 No. 25 (Polish) Elementary Flying Training SchoolRAF
 No. 2859 Squadron RAF Regiment
 No. 4183 Anti-Aircraft Flight RAF Regiment

References

Royal Air Force stations in Cambridgeshire